Yáng Kāihuì (courtesy name: Yúnjǐn; 6 November 1901 – 14 November 1930) was the second wife of Mao Zedong, whom he married in 1920. She had three children with Mao Zedong: Mao Anying, Mao Anqing, and Mao Anlong. Her father was Yang Changji, the head of the Hunan First Normal School and one of Mao's favorite teachers.

Early life
Yang Kaihui was born in the small village of Bancang in Changsha, Hunan Province, on 6 November 1901. Her name meant "Opening Wisdom", although she came to be nicknamed Xia, meaning "Little Dawn." Her father was Yang Changji, a teacher and leftist intellectual, her mother was Xiang Zhenxi, while she had a brother three years older than her, Yang Kaizhi. Through his teaching of ethics at the First Normal School of Changsha, Changji had become a father figure to a pupil named Mao Zedong, later writing in his journal that "it is truly difficult to imagine someone so intelligent and handsome" as him. A friendship developing, in summer 1916, Mao was invited to spend several days at Yang's Bancang home, walking twenty miles in straw sandals in order to get there. On this occasion, he did not talk to either Zhenxi or Kaizhi, instead bowing his head to them as a mark of respect.

Yang Changji gained a professorship at Peking University and had moved his family to the city when Mao came to Peking in September 1918 with several like-minded friends from Hunan. Upon arrival, they stayed in the Yangs' small house in the north of the city. Here, Mao met Kaihui again, and the two discovered a mutual attraction. A friend who knew Kaihui at the time described her as "small in stature and round-faced, with deep-set eyes and pale white skin", and her appearance impressed both Mao and his friends. Kaihui later related that she had "fallen madly in love with him already when I heard about his numerous accomplishments" but did not make her feelings immediately known. She kept "hoping and dreaming" that he shared her feelings and decided that she would never marry anyone but him.

Their relationship did not develop swiftly, as Mao was shy and lacked sufficient funds to court her, living in cramped rented accommodation with other Hunanese students in Peking's Three-Eyed Well district. Changji secured Mao a job at the university library as assistant to the librarian Li Dazhao, an early Chinese communist.

In January 1920, Yang Changji died. Mao was in Peking ostensibly on business, though biographer Stuart Schram suspected his presence was partly due to his desire to comfort Kaihui. Yang Kaihui and her mother returned to Changsha with her father's remains, and she soon entered the Fusiang Girls’ School. At the missionary school, her exposure to revolutionary ideas got her labeled a 'rebel', who refused to pray and cut her hair short in defiance of convention.

Mao had gone from Peking to Shanghai, where he worked in a laundry and joined a Communist group for the first time. Following the overthrow of Hunanese warlord Zhang Jingyao by generals favourable to Mao, he returned to Changsha in July 1920. Mao opened a bookstore and publishing house. Now possessing social status and financial security, Mao was able to marry Kaihui.

Revolutionary experience
Yang joined the Chinese Socialism Youth League in the second half of 1920 as one of the first members in Hunan. She married Mao Zedong that winter, without any wedding ceremony or other celebrations. Yang joined the Communist Party of China (CPC) in the beginning of 1922. 

By the 1920s, the Communist movement in China used a labor and peasant organizing strategy that combined workplace advocacy with women's rights advocacy. The Communists would lead union organizing efforts among male workers while simultaneously working in nearby peasant communities on women's rights issues, including literacy for women. Yang and Mao were among the most effective Communist political organizers using this method, using it in the Anyuan mines and nearby peasant communities.

In April 1923, Mao went to the CPC's Central Committee in Shanghai to work as the Organization Department Minister. In the following year, Yang, together with her two children, Mao Anying and Mao Anqing, joined her husband in Shanghai and organized an evening school at a cotton mill. In 1925, accompanied by Mao, Yang Kaihui went to Shaoshan to organize peasant movements, while caring for her husband and educating their children. At the same time, she continued to teach peasant evening schools and contracted with other comrades. In the beginning of 1927, Mao inspected the peasant movement in Hunan. Yang Kaihui sorted through the large amount of investigation materials and neatly copied them down. Mao's Report on an Investigation of the Peasant Movement in Hunan including Yang's contributions, was published in March of that year. During this period Yang organized many movements among peasants, labor, women, and students.

After the National Revolution failed, Yang returned alone to Bancang to organize underground revolutions and lead fights against the Kuomintang (KMT) in Changsha, Pingjiang, and the borders of Xiangyin. Amid the great difficulties and dangers, Yang wrote many letters to her cousin Yang Kaiming, asking him to take good care of her children and mother if she met a sudden death. Because of the great distance and spare communication with Mao over the next three years, Yang often only saw news about her husband in the KMT's newspapers and worried greatly about his safety.

In early 1928, Mao began a relationship with He Zizhen without ending his marriage with Yang Kaihui.

Death
In October 1930, the local KMT warlord He Jian captured Yang Kaihui and her son Mao Anying. Her captors wanted her to publicly renounce Mao Zedong and the CPC, but she refused to do so. Even under torture, she is reputed to have told her captors, "You could kill me as you like, you would never get anything from my mouth... Chopping off the head is like the passing of wind, death could frighten cowards, rather than our Communists... Even if the seas run dry and the rocks crumble, I would never break off relations with Mao Zedong"... "I prefer to die for the success of Mao's revolutionary career".

Yang was executed in Changsha on 14 November 1930 at the age of 29.  Her children with Mao Zedong were effectively orphaned, and were rediscovered years later. Mao Anying later died early in the Korean War, and Mao Anqing became a translator for the Central Committee of the Communist Party of China.

Influence of Yang Kaihui's death on Mao
Although he would have relationships with other women, Mao mourned Kaihui for the rest of his life.
In summer 1937, he conversed with the American reporter Agnes Smedley, reciting to her a poem that he had written in memory of Kaihui.

In spring 1957, Li Shuyi, a friend and comrade of Mao and Yang's, wrote a poem in memory of her own husband, Liu Chih-hsün, a member of the Red Army who had been killed in 1933. Sending her poem to Mao, he responded by composing his own poem commemorating both Liu and Kaihui, titled "The Immortals", which he would subsequently publish:

The allusion to poplar trees is a reference to Yang, whose surname meant "poplar", while that to willows alludes to Liu's surname, which meant "willow".

Poetry
Yang wrote poems to express her loneliness and her longing for Mao. One of them, "偶感 [Ǒu Gǎn]" ("Occasional Feeling"), was written in October 1928, two years before her death, and discovered when her former residence was being repaired about 50 years later:

Movie and television portrayals

2011

 Portrayed by Zhou Dongyu in the movie The Road Of Exploring.
 Portrayed by Li Qin in the movieThe Founding of a Party and on the TV series China in 1921.
 Portrayed by Zhang Meng on the TV series Epoch-Making.

2017

 Portrayed by Li Qin in the movie The Founding of an Army.
 Portrayed by Sarah Zhao on the TV series Autumn Harvest Uprising.

2021

 Portrayed by Zhou Ye in the movie 1921.

References

Citations

Sources 

 
 
 
 
 
 
 
 Verity Wilson, "Dressing for Leadership in China: Wives and Husbands in an Age of Revolutions (1911-1976)", Gender & History, vol. 14, no. 3 (November 2002), pp. 608–628.

Spouses of national leaders
People from Changsha
Mao Zedong family
Executed Chinese people
Executed Chinese women
1901 births
1930 deaths
Executed Republic of China people
People executed by the Republic of China by firing squad
20th-century executions by China
Executed people from Hunan